Plácido Domingo Sings Tangos is a 1981 album by Plácido Domingo. The album was recorded in Argentina where it sold over 80,000 copies.

Track listing
"Caminito"	3:18
"Nostalgias"	3:31 Music by: Juan Carlos Cobian. Lyrics by: Enrique Cadicamo. (1936)
"Volver"	3:26
Vida mía	3:51 Music: Osvaldo Fresedo Lyrics: Emilio Fresedo (1933)
"Mi Buenos Aires querido"	3:24
El día que me quieras	3:41
"Uno"	3:45
"María"	3:04
"Alma de bohemio"	3:16 Music: Roberto Firpo Lyrics: Juan Andrés Caruso (1914)
"Cuesta abajo"	3:26 "Si arrastré por estemundo"  Lyricist: Alfredo Le Pera Composer: Carlos Gardel (1934)

Certifications

References

Plácido Domingo albums